John Michael Deni (May 8, 1903 – February 4, 1978) was an American racewalker. He competed in the men's 50 kilometres walk at the 1948 Summer Olympics and the 1952 Summer Olympics.

References

1903 births
1978 deaths
Athletes (track and field) at the 1948 Summer Olympics
Athletes (track and field) at the 1952 Summer Olympics
American male racewalkers
Olympic track and field athletes of the United States
Place of birth missing